Ectoedemia simiicola is a moth of the family Nepticulidae. It was described by Scoble in 1983. It is known from South Africa (it was described from the Cape Province).

The larvae feed on Diospyros dichrophylla.

References

Endemic moths of South Africa
Nepticulidae
Moths of Africa